USNS Catawba is a  operated by the Military Sealift Command for the United States Navy. Currently home ported in Manama, Bahrain.

Ship history

USNS Catawba was deployed to the Northern Persian Gulf during the second Gulf War (Feb-Mar 2003). Her divers provided critical assistance in recovering the bodies of aircrew from two 849 Naval Air Squadron Sea King ASaC.7 helicopters which had collided on 22 March 2003 off the Al-Faw Peninsula, while operating from HMS Ark Royal.

Catawba provided MV Faina with food, water, and medical supplies after that ship was released by Somali pirates.

References

US Navy Fact File

 

Tugs of the United States Navy
Cold War auxiliary ships of the United States
Ships built by Marinette Marine
1979 ships